Adina Hinze (born 4 July 1983) is a German volleyball player who played for the German Women's National Team.

She represented her native country at the 2003 Women's European Volleyball Championship, finishing third.

Honours
 2003 European Championship — 3rd place

References

External links
https://www.abendblatt.de/hamburg/harburg/sport/article107387020/Mit-Adina-Hinze-kam-die-Wende.html
https://beach.volleyball-verband.de/public/spieler.php?id=52859
http://www.worldofvolley.com/wov-community/players/26533/adina-hinze.html
http://www.scala-volleyball.de/

1982 births
Living people
People from Ansbach (district)
Sportspeople from Middle Franconia
German women's volleyball players
Volleyball players at the 2004 Summer Olympics
Olympic volleyball players of Germany